Courtney Bryan (born October 2, 1984) is a former American football safety. He was born in San Jose, California, and played college football at New Mexico State. He was signed by the Miami Dolphins as an undrafted free agent in 2007. 

He is the younger brother of NFL defensive end Copeland Bryan.

Early years
Bryan attended Lincoln High School in San Jose, California and was a student and a letterman in football, basketball, and track. Now he works as a Sheriff at Santa Clara County.

External links
Miami Dolphins bio
New Mexico State Aggies bio

1984 births
Living people
Players of American football from San Jose, California
Players of Canadian football from San Jose, California
American football safeties
American football cornerbacks
New Mexico State Aggies football players
Miami Dolphins players